The 2004 Summer Olympics, officially the Games of the XXVIII Olympiad and also known as Athens 2004, were an international multi-sport event held from 13 to 29 August 2004 in Athens, Greece. The Games saw 10,625 athletes compete, some 600 more than expected, accompanied by 5,501 team officials from 201 countries, with 301 medal events in 28 different sports. The 2004 Games marked the first time since the 1996 Summer Olympics that all countries with a National Olympic Committee were in attendance, and also marked the first time Athens hosted the Games since their first modern incarnation in 1896 as well as the return of the Olympic games to its birthplace. Athens became one of only four cities at the time to have hosted the Summer Olympic Games on two occasions (together with Paris, London and Los Angeles). A new medal obverse was introduced at these Games, replacing the design by Giuseppe Cassioli that had been used since 1928. The new design features the Panathenaic Stadium in Athens rectifying the long-running mistake of using a depiction of the Roman Colosseum rather than a Greek venue. The 2004 Games was the first of two consecutive Olympic games to be held in Southern Europe since the 1992 Summer Olympics in Barcelona, Spain, and was followed by the 2006 Winter Olympics in Turin, Italy.

The 2004 Olympic Games were hailed as "unforgettable dream games" by then-IOC President Jacques Rogge, and left Athens with a significantly improved infrastructure, including a new airport, ring road and subway system. However, there has been debate regarding the cost of the Games and their possible contribution to the 2010–18 Greek government-debt crisis, although there is little or no evidence supporting such a correlation. The 2004 Games were generally deemed to be a success, with the rising standard of competition amongst nations across the world. The final medal tally was led by the United States, followed by China and Russia with host nation Greece at 15th place. Several world and Olympic records were also broken during these Games. 
 
Chile, Chinese Taipei,  Dominican Republic, Georgia and Israel won their first Olympic gold medals. Eritrea and Paraguay won their first ever Olympic medals. 
The United Arab Emirates (UAE) won both their first Olympic medal and gold medal in this event.

Host city selection

Athens was chosen as the host city during the 106th IOC Session held in Lausanne, Switzerland on 5 September 1997. The Greek capital had lost its bid to organize the 1996 Summer Olympics to the American city of Atlanta nearly seven years before, during the 96th IOC Session in Tokyo, Japan on 18 September 1990. Under the direction of Gianna Angelopoulos-Daskalaki, Athens pursued another bid, this time for the right to host the Summer Olympics in 2004. The success of Athens in securing the 2004 Games was based largely on the bid's appeal to human values, the history of the Games from ancient age and modern age and the emphasis that Athens is placed at the pivotal role that Greece and Athens could play in promoting the Modern Olympism and the Olympic Movement. Unlike the 1996 bid that was seen arrogant when the city was bidding, the 2004 bid was lauded for its low scale, humility, honest and earnestness, its focused message, and a more real and detailed bid concept. During the unsuccessful 1996 bid, concerns and criticisms were raised – primarily regarding critical subjects about the city's infrastructural readiness, its air pollution, its budget and politicization of the Games' events and their preparations. The subsequent successful organization of another events as the 1991 Mediterranean Games, the 1994 FIVB Volleyball Men's World Championship, 1994 World Fencing Championships and the successful 1997 World Championships in Athletics, one month before the Olympic host city election was crucial in allaying lingering fears and concerns among the sporting community and some IOC members about the Greek ability to host international sporting events. Another factor that contributed to the Greek capital's selection was a growing sentiment among some IOC members to restore some original values of the Olympics to the Modern Games, a component which they felt was lost during the 1996 Summer Olympics.

After leading all voting rounds, Athens easily defeated Rome in the fifth and final vote. Cape Town, Stockholm, and Buenos Aires, the three other cities that made the IOC shortlist, were eliminated in prior rounds of voting. Six other cities submitted applications, but their bids were dropped by the IOC in 1996. These cities were Istanbul, Lille, Rio de Janeiro (the latter won the rights to host the 2016 Summer Olympics in 2009), San Juan, Seville, and Saint Petersburg.

Development and preparation

Costs 
The 2004 Summer Olympic Games cost the Government of Greece near €9 billion to stage. According to the cost-benefit evaluation of the impact of the Athens 2004 Olympic Games presented to the Greek Parliament in January 2013 by the Minister of Finance Mr. Giannis Stournaras, the overall net economic benefit for Greece was positive.

The Athens 2004 Organizing Committee (ATHOC), responsible for the preparation and organisation of the Games, concluded its operations as a company in 2005 with a surplus of €130.6 million.  The State's contribution to the total ATHOC budget was 8% of its expenditure against an originally anticipated 14%.

The overall revenue of ATHOC, including income from tickets, sponsors, broadcasting rights, merchandise sales etc,totalled near €2,1 million. The largest percentage of that income (38%) came from media rights. 

It was in this sense that the Greek Ministry of Finance reported in 2013 that the expenses of the Greek state for the Athens 2004 Olympic and Paralympic Games, including both infrastructure and organizational costs, reached the amount of €8.5 billion. The same report further explains that €2 billion of this amount was covered by the revenue of the ATHOC (from tickets, sponsors, broadcasting rights, merchandise sales etc.) and that another €2 billion was directly invested in upgrading hospitals and preserving archaeological sites.
Therefore, the net infrastructure costs related to the preparation of the Athens 2004 Olympic Games was €4.5 billion, substantially lower than the reported estimates, and mainly included long-standing fixed asset investments in numerous municipal and transport infrastructures.

On the revenue side, the same report estimates that incremental tax revenues of approximately €3.5 billion arose from the increased activities caused by the Athens 2004 Olympic Games during the period 2000 to 2004. These tax revenues were paid directly to the Greek state specifically in the form of incremental social security contributions, income taxes and VAT tax paid by all the companies, professionals, and service providers that were directly involved with the Olympic Games. Moreover, it is reported that the Athens 2004 Olympic Games have had a great economic growth impact on the Greek economy, in the words of the Greek Minister of Finance, is that "as a result from the cost-benefit analysis, we reach the conclusion that there has been a net economic benefit from the Olympic Games"

Comparison to other Olympic Games

Cost per sporting event for Athens 2004 was US$9.8 million. This compares with US$14.9 million for Rio 2016, US$49.5 million for London 2012, and US$22.5 million for Beijing 2008. Average cost per event for the Summer Games since 1960 is US$19.9 million.

Cost per athlete for Athens 2004 was US$0.3 million. This compares with US$0.4 million for Rio 2016, US$1.4 million for London 2012, and US$0.6 million for Beijing 2008. Average cost per athlete for the Summer Games since 1960 is US$0.6 million.

Cost overrun for Athens 2004 was 49%, measured in real terms from the bid to host the Games. This compares with 51% for Rio 2016 and 76% for London 2012. Average cost overrun for the Summer Games since 1960 is 176%.

Construction

By late March 2004, some Olympic projects were still behind schedule, and Greek authorities announced that a roof it had initially proposed as an optional, non-vital addition to the Aquatics Center would no longer be built. The main Olympic Stadium, the designated facility for the opening and closing ceremonies, was completed only two months before the Games opened. This stadium was completed with a retractable glass roof designed by Spanish architect Santiago Calatrava. The same architect also designed the Velodrome and other facilities.

Infrastructure, such as the tram line linking venues in southern Athens with the city centre, and numerous venues were considerably behind schedule just two months before the start of the Games. The subsequent pace of preparation, however, made the rush to finish the Athens venues one of the tightest in Olympics history. The Greeks, unperturbed, maintained that they would make it all along. By July/August 2004, all venues were delivered: in August, the Olympic Stadium was officially completed and opened, joined or preceded by the official completion and openings of other venues within the Athens Olympic Sports Complex (OAKA), and the sports complexes in Faliro and Helliniko.

Late July and early August witnessed the Athens Tram become operational, and this system provided additional connections to those already existing between Athens city centre and its waterfront communities along the Saronic Gulf. These communities included the port city of Piraeus, Agios Kosmas (site of the sailing venue), Helliniko (the site of the old international airport which now contained the fencing venue, the canoe/kayak slalom course, the 15,000-seat Helliniko Olympic Basketball Arena, and the softball and baseball stadia), and the Faliro Coastal Zone Olympic Complex (site of the taekwondo, handball, indoor volleyball, and beach volleyball venues, as well as the newly reconstructed Karaiskaki Stadium for football). The upgrades to the Athens Ring Road were also delivered just in time, as were the expressway upgrades connecting central Athens with peripheral areas such as Markopoulo (site of the shooting and equestrian venues), the newly constructed Eleftherios Venizelos International Airport, Schinias (site of the rowing venue), Maroussi (site of the OAKA), Parnitha (site of the Olympic Village), Galatsi (site of the rhythmic gymnastics and table tennis venue), and Vouliagmeni (site of the triathlon venue). The upgrades to the Athens Metro were also completed, and the new lines became operational by mid-summer.

EMI released Unity, the official pop album of the Athens Olympics, in the leadup to the Olympics. It features contributions from Sting, Lenny Kravitz, Moby, Destiny's Child, and Avril Lavigne. EMI has pledged to donate US$180,000 from the album to UNICEF's HIV/AIDS program in Sub-Saharan Africa.

At least 14 people died during the work on the facilities. Most of these people were not from Greece.

Before the Games, Greek hotel staff staged a series of one-day strikes over wage disputes. They had been asking for a significant raise for the period covering the event being staged. Paramedics and ambulance drivers also protested. They claimed to have the right to the same Olympic bonuses promised to their security force counterparts.

Torch relay

The lighting ceremony of the Olympic flame took place on 25 March 2004 in Ancient Olympia. For the first time ever, the flame travelled around the world in a relay to various Summer Olympic host cities (past and future) and other large cities, before returning to Greece.

Mascots

Mascots have been a tradition at the Olympic Games since the 1968 Winter Olympics in Grenoble, France. The 2004 Olympics had two official mascots: Athena and Phevos (Greek pronunciation: Athina and Fivos). The sister and brother were named after Athena, the goddess of wisdom, strategy and war, and Phoebus, the god of light and music, respectively. They were inspired by the ancient daidala, which were toy dolls that also had religious connotations.

Online coverage
For the first time, major broadcasters were allowed to serve video coverage of the Olympics over the Internet, provided that they restricted this service geographically, to protect broadcasting contracts in other areas. The International Olympic Committee forbade Olympic athletes, as well as coaches, support personnel and other officials, from setting up specialized weblogs and/or other websites for covering their personal perspective of the Games. They were not allowed to post audio, video, or photos that they had taken. An exception was made if an athlete already has a personal website that was not set up specifically for the Games. NBC launched its own Olympic website, NBCOlympics.com. Focusing on the television coverage of the Games, it did provide video clips, medal standings, live results. Its main purpose, however, was to provide a schedule of what sports were on the many stations of NBC Universal. The Games were shown on television 24 hours a day, on one network or another.

Technology

As with any enterprise, the Organizing Committee and everyone involved with it relied heavily on technology in order to deliver a successful event. ATHOC maintained two separate data networks, one for the preparation of the Games (known as the Administrative network) and one for the Games themselves (Games Network). The technical infrastructure involved more than 11,000 computers, over 600 servers, 2,000 printers, 23,000 fixed-line telephone devices, 9,000 mobile phones, 12,000 TETRA devices, 16,000 TV and video devices and 17 Video Walls interconnected by more than 6,000 kilometers of cabling (both optical fiber and twisted pair).

This infrastructure was created and maintained to serve directly more than 150,000 ATHOC Staff, Volunteers, Olympic family members (IOC, NOCs, Federations), Partners & Sponsors and Media. It also kept the information flowing for all spectators, TV viewers, Website visitors and news readers around the world, prior and during the Games. The Media Center was located inside the Zappeion which is a Greek national exhibition center.

Between June and August 2004, the technology staff worked in the Technology Operations Center (TOC) from where it could centrally monitor and manage all the devices and flow of information, as well as handle any problems that occurred during the Games. The TOC was organized in teams (e.g. Systems, Telecommunications, Information Security, Data Network, Staffing, etc.) under a TOC Director and corresponding team leaders (Shift Managers). The TOC operated on a 24x7 basis with personnel organized into 12-hour shifts.

The Games

Opening ceremony

The opening ceremony of the games, directed by choreographer Dimitris Papaioannou and produced by Jack Morton Worldwide, led by project director David Zolkwer, was held on 13 August 2004. It began with a twenty-eight (the number of the Olympiads up to then) second countdown paced by the sounds of an amplified heartbeat. As the countdown was completed, fireworks rumbled and illuminated the skies overhead. After a drum corps and bouzouki players joined in an opening march, the video screen showed images of flight, crossing southwest from Athens over the Greek countryside to ancient Olympia. Then, a single drummer in the ancient stadium joined in a drum duet with a single drummer in the main stadium in Athens, joining the original ancient Olympic Games with the modern ones in symbolism. At the end of the drum duet, a single flaming arrow was launched from the video screen (symbolically from ancient Olympia) and into the reflecting pool, which resulted in fire erupting in the middle of the stadium creating a burning image of the Olympic rings rising from the pool. The Opening Ceremony was a pageant of traditional Greek culture and history hearkening back to its mythological beginnings. The program began as a young Greek boy sailed into the stadium on a 'paper-ship' waving the host nation's flag to aethereal music by Hadjidakis and then a centaur appeared, followed by a gigantic head of a cycladic figurine which eventually broke into many pieces symbolising the Greek islands. Underneath the cycladic head was a Hellenistic representation of the human body, reflecting the concept and belief in perfection reflected in Greek art. A man was seen balancing on a hovering cube symbolising man's eternal 'split' between passion and reason followed by a couple of young lovers playfully chasing each other while the god Eros was hovering above them. There followed a very colourful float parade chronicling Greek history from the ancient Minoan civilization to modern times.

Although NBC in the United States presented the entire opening ceremony from start to finish, a topless Minoan priestess was shown only briefly, the breasts having been pixelated digitally in order to avoid controversy (as the "Nipplegate" incident was still fresh in viewer's minds at the time) and potential fines by the Federal Communications Commission. Also, lower frontal nudity of men dressed as ancient Greek statues was shown in such a way that the area below the waist was cut off by the bottom of the screen. Overall, NBC's coverage of the Olympics has been praised, and the company was awarded with 6 Emmy Awards for its coverage of the Games and technical production.

Following the artistic performances, a parade of nations entered the stadium with over 10,500 athletes walking under the banners of 201 nations. The nations were arranged according to Greek alphabet making the Philippines, Finland, Fiji, Chile, and Hong Kong the last five to enter the stadium before the Greek delegation. On this occasion, in observance of the tradition that the delegation of Greece opens the parade and the host nation closes it, the Greek flag bearer opened the parade and all the Greek delegation closed it. Based on audience reaction, the emotional high point of the parade was the entrance of the delegation from Afghanistan which had been absent from the Olympics and had female competitors for the first time. The Iraqi delegation also stirred emotions. Also recognized was the symbolic unified march of athletes from North Korea and South Korea under the Korean Unification Flag. The country of Kiribati made its debut appearance at these Games and East Timor made a debut under its own flag. After the Parade of Nations, during which the Dutch DJ Tiësto provided the music, the Icelandic singer Björk performed the song "Oceania", written specially for the event by her and the poet Sjón.

The opening ceremony culminated in the lighting of the Olympic cauldron by 1996 gold medalist windsurfer Nikolaos Kaklamanakis. Many key moments in the ceremony, including the lighting of the Olympic Cauldron, featured music composed and arranged by New Zealander composer John Psathas. The gigantic cauldron, which was styled after the Athens 2004 Olympic torch, pivoted down to be lit by the 35-year-old, before slowly swinging up and lifting the flame above the stadium. Following this, a fireworks display commenced to conclude the ceremony.

Participating National Olympic Committees

All National Olympic Committees (NOCs) except Djibouti participated in the Athens Games. Two new NOCs had been created since 2000 and made their debut at these Games (Kiribati and East Timor). Therefore, with the return of Afghanistan (who had been banned from the 2000 Summer Olympics), the number of participating nations increased from 199 to 201. Also since 2000, Yugoslavia had changed its name to Serbia and Montenegro and its code from YUG to SCG. Georgia's new flag made its debut at the Olympics by unfurling it at the opening ceremony on 13 August. It replaces the post-Soviet flag, which had been used since Lillehammer 1994.

In the table below, the number in parentheses indicates the number of participants contributed by each NOC.

 Four athletes from  took part in the opening ceremony, but for reasons unknown, they did not compete at the Games.

Sports
The sports featured at the 2004 Summer Olympics are listed below. Officially there were 301 events in 28 sports as swimming, diving, synchronised swimming and water polo are classified by the IOC as disciplines within the sport of aquatics, and wheelchair racing was a demonstration sport. For the first time, the wrestling category featured women's wrestling and in the fencing competition women competed in the sabre. American Kristin Heaston, who led off the qualifying round of women's shot put became the first woman to compete at the ancient site of Olympia.

The demonstration sport of wheelchair racing was a joint Olympic/Paralympic event, allowing a Paralympic event to occur within the Olympics, and for the future, opening up the wheelchair race to the able-bodied. The 2004 Summer Paralympics were also held in Athens, from 17 to 28 September.

Gallery

Calendar
All times are in Eastern European Summer Time (UTC+3)
 31 sports

Highlights
 Greek sprinters Konstantinos Kenteris and Ekaterini Thanou withdraw from the games after allegedly staging a motorcycle accident in order to avoid a drug test.
 The shot put event was held in ancient Olympia, site of the ancient Olympic Games (this was the very first time women athletes competed in Ancient Olympia), while the archery competition and the men's and women's marathon finish were held in the Panathenaic Stadium, in which the 1896 Games were held.
 Kiribati and Timor Leste participated in the Olympic Games for the first time.
 Women's wrestling and women's sabre made their Olympic debut at the 2004 Games.
 With 6 gold, 6 silver, and 4 bronze medals, Greece had its best medal tally in over 100 years (since hosting the 1896 Olympics), continuing the nation's sporting success after winning Euro 2004 in July.
 The marathon was held on the same route as the 1896 Games, beginning in the site of the Battle of Marathon to the Panathenaic Stadium in Athens.
 Australia became the first country in Olympic history to win more gold medals (17) immediately after hosting the Olympics in Sydney 2000 where they won 16 gold medals.
 World record holder and strong favourite Paula Radcliffe crashed out of the women's marathon in spectacular fashion, leaving Mizuki Noguchi to win the gold.
 While leading in the men's marathon with less than 10 kilometres to go, Brazilian runner Vanderlei Cordeiro de Lima was attacked by Irish priest Neil Horan and dragged into the crowd. De Lima recovered to take bronze, and was later awarded the Pierre de Coubertin medal for sportsmanship. Twelve years later, at the opening ceremony of the 2016 Summer Olympics, he lit the Olympic Cauldron at Maracanã Stadium.
 British athlete Kelly Holmes won gold in the 800 m and 1500 m.
 Liu Xiang won the first ever gold medal in men's track and field for China in the 110 m hurdles, equalling Colin Jackson's 1993 World Record time of 12.91 seconds.
 Kenyan runners swept the medals in the 3000 meters steeple chase.
 The Olympics saw Afghanistan's first return to the Games since 1996 (it was banned due to the Taliban's extremist attitudes towards women, but was reinstated in 2002).
 Hicham El Guerrouj wins gold in the 1500 m and 5000 m. He was the first person to accomplish this feat at the Olympics since Paavo Nurmi in 1924.
 Greek athlete Fani Halkia came out of retirement to win the 400 m hurdles.
 The US women's 4×200 m swimming team of Natalie Coughlin, Carly Piper, Dana Vollmer and Kaitlin Sandeno won gold, smashing the long-standing world record set by the German Democratic Republic in 1987.
 Argentina beat Italy 84–69 in the men's basketball final for their first gold medal in the sport.
 Windsurfer Gal Fridman won Israel's first-ever gold medal.
 Dominican athlete Félix Sánchez won the first ever gold medal for the Dominican Republic in the 400 m hurdles event.
 German kayaker Birgit Fischer won gold in the K-4 500 m and silver in the K-2 500 m. In so doing, she became the first woman in any sport to win gold medals at 6 different Olympics, the first woman to win gold 24 years apart and the first person in Olympic history to win two or more medals in five different Games.
 Swimmer Michael Phelps became the first athlete to win 8 medals (6 gold and 2 bronze) in non-boycotted Olympics.
 United States' gymnast Carly Patterson became the second American woman to win the all-around gold medal, and the first American woman to win the all-around competition at a non-boycotted Olympic Games.
 Chilean Tennis players Nicolás Massu and Fernando Gonzalez won the gold medal in the Doubles Competition, while Massu won the gold and Gonzalez the bronze on the Singles competition. These were Chile's first-ever gold medals. With these victories, Massú became the thirteenth Tennis player (and the eighth male player) in history to have won the gold medal in both the Singles and Doubles Competition during the same Olympic Games. He also became the second Tennis player, and first male player, to have achieved this feat in modern Olympic Tennis (1988 onwards). The first player to do so was Venus Williams in 2000.
 Usain Bolt of Jamaica, in his first career Olympic Games, finished fifth in his 200m dash heat in 21.05 seconds, failing to qualify for the second round. In the years to come, he would go on to become the world's fastest man, with multiple world records in the 100m, 200m and 4×100m and a medal count of over 29 global medals, including 8 Olympic gold medals and 11 World Championships gold medals.

Closing ceremony

The Games were concluded on 29 August 2004. The closing ceremony was held at the Athens Olympic Stadium, where the Games had been opened 16 days earlier. Around 70,000 people gathered in the stadium to watch the ceremony.

The initial part of the ceremony interspersed the performances of various Greek singers, and featured traditional Greek dance performances from various regions of Greece (Crete, Pontos, Thessaly, etc.). The event was meant to highlight the pride of the Greeks in their culture and country for the world to see.

A significant part of the closing ceremony was the exchange of the Olympic flag of the Athens Games between the mayor of Athens and the mayor of Beijing, host city of the next Olympics. After the flag exchange a presentation from the Beijing delegation presented a glimpse into Chinese culture for the world to see. Beijing University students (who were at first incorrectly cited as the Twelve Girls Band) sang Mo Li Hua (Jasmine Flower) accompanied by a ribbon dancer, then some male dancers did a routine with tai-chi and acrobatics, followed by dancers from the Peking Opera and finally, a little Chinese girl singing a reprise of Mo Li Hua and concluded the presentation by saying "Welcome to Beijing!"

The medal ceremony for the last event of the Olympics, the men's marathon, was conducted, with Stefano Baldini from Italy as the winner. The bronze medal winner, Vanderlei Cordeiro de Lima of Brazil, was simultaneously announced as a recipient of the Pierre de Coubertin medal for his bravery in finishing the race despite being attacked by a rogue spectator while leading with 7 km to go.

A flag-bearer from each nation's delegation then entered along the stage, followed by the competitors en masse on the floor. All of them were led by Pyrros Dimas (weightlifter) and Liu Xiang (hurdler).

Short speeches were presented by Gianna Angelopoulos-Daskalaki, President of the Organising Committee, and by President Dr. Jacques Rogge of the IOC, in which he described the Athens Olympics as "unforgettable, dream Games".

Dr. Rogge had previously declared he would be breaking with tradition in his closing speech as President of the IOC and that he would never use the words of his predecessor Juan Antonio Samaranch, who used to always say 'these were the best ever games'. Dr. Rogge had described Salt Lake City 2002 as "superb games" and in turn would continue after Athens 2004 and describe Turin 2006 as "truly magnificent games."

The national anthems of Greece and China were played in a handover ceremony as both nations' flags were raised. The Mayor of Athens, Dora Bakoyianni, passed the Olympic Flag to the Mayor of Beijing, Wang Qishan. After a short cultural performance by Chinese actors, dancers, and musicians directed by eminent Chinese director Zhang Yimou, Rogge declared the 2004 Olympic Games closed. The Olympic flag was next raised again on 10 February 2006 during the opening ceremony of the next Winter Olympics in Torino.

A young Greek girl, 10-year-old Fotini Papaleonidopoulou, lit a symbolic lantern with the Olympic Flame and passed it on to other children before "extinguishing" the flame in the cauldron by blowing a puff of air. The ceremony ended with a variety of musical performances by Greek singers, including Dionysis Savvopoulos, George Dalaras, Haris Alexiou, Anna Vissi, Sakis Rouvas, Eleftheria Arvanitaki, Alkistis Protopsalti, Antonis Remos, Michalis Hatzigiannis, Marinella, and Dimitra Galani, as thousands of athletes carried out symbolic displays on the stadium floor.

Medal count

These are the top ten nations that won medals in the 2004 Games.

Venues

OAKA

 Athens Olympic Aquatic Centre – diving, swimming, synchronized swimming, water polo
 Athens Olympic Tennis Centre – tennis
 Athens Olympic Velodrome – cycling (track)
 Olympic Indoor Hall – basketball (final), gymnastics (artistic, trampolining)
 Olympic Stadium – ceremonies (opening/ closing), athletics, football (final)

HOC
 Fencing Hall – fencing
 Helliniko Indoor Arena – basketball, handball (final)
 Olympic Baseball Centre – baseball
 Olympic Canoe/Kayak Slalom Centre – canoeing (slalom)
 Olympic Hockey Centre – field hockey
 Olympic Softball Stadium – softball

Faliro

 Faliro Olympic Beach Volleyball Centre – volleyball (beach)
 Faliro Sports Pavilion Arena – handball, taekwondo
 Peace and Friendship Stadium – volleyball (indoor)

GOC
 Goudi Olympic Hall – badminton
 Olympic Modern Pentathlon Centre – modern pentathlon

MOC
 Markopoulo Olympic Equestrian Centre – equestrian
 Markopoulo Olympic Shooting Centre – shooting

Football venues
 Kaftanzoglio Stadium (Thessaloniki)
 Karaiskakis Stadium (Piraeus)
 Pampeloponnisiako Stadium (Patras)
 Pankritio Stadium (Heraklion)
 Panthessaliko Stadium (Volos)

Other venues

 Agios Kosmas Olympic Sailing Centre – sailing
 Ano Liosia Olympic Hall – judo, wrestling
 Galatsi Olympic Hall – gymnastics (rhythmic), table tennis
 Kotzia Square – cycling (individual road race)
 Marathon (city) – athletics (marathon start)
 Nikaia Olympic Weightlifting Hall – weightlifting
 Panathenaic Stadium – archery, athletics (marathons finish)
 Peristeri Olympic Boxing Hall – boxing
 Schinias Olympic Rowing and Canoeing Centre – canoeing (sprint), rowing
 Stadium at Olympia – athletics (shot put)
 Vouliagmeni Olympic Centre – cycling (individual time trial), triathlon

Sponsors

Legacy

To commemorate the 2004 Olympics, a series of Greek high value euro collectors' coins were minted by the Mint of Greece, in both silver and gold. The pieces depict landmarks in Greece as well as ancient and modern sports on the obverse of the coin. On the reverse, a common motif with the logo of the Games, circled by an olive branch representing the spirit of the Games.

Preparations to stage the Olympics led to a number of positive developments for the city's infrastructure. These improvements included the establishment of Eleftherios Venizelos International Airport, a modern new international airport serving as Greece's main aviation gateway; expansions to the Athens Metro system; the "Tram", a new metropolitan tram (light rail) system system; the "Proastiakos", a new suburban railway system linking the airport and suburban towns to the city of Athens; the "Attiki Odos", a new toll motorway encircling the city, and the conversion of streets into pedestrianized walkways in the historic center of Athens which link several of the city's main tourist sites, including the Parthenon and the Panathenaic Stadium (the site of the first modern Olympic Games in 1896). All of the above infrastructure is still in use to this day, and there have been continued expansions and proposals to expand Athens' metro, tram, suburban rail and motorway network, the airport, as well as further plans to pedestrianize more thoroughfares in the historic center of Athens.

The Greek Government has created a corporation, Olympic Properties SA, which is overseeing the post-Olympics management, development and conversion of these facilities, some of which will be sold off (or have already been sold off) to the private sector, while some other facilities are still in use, or have been converted for commercial use or modified for other sports.

As of 2012 many conversion schemes have stalled owing to the Greek government-debt crisis, though many of these facilities are now under the control of domestic sporting clubs and organizations or the private sector.

The table below delineates the current status of the Athens Olympic facilities:

Arguments about possible effects on Greece's debt crisis 

There have been arguments (mostly in popular media) that the cost of the 2004 Athens Summer Games was a contributor to the Greek government-debt crisis that started in 2010, with a lot of focus on the use of the facilities after the Games. This argument, however, contradicts the fact that Greece's Debt to GDP ratio was essentially not affected until the 2008 world financial crisis, while the cost of the Games, spread over years of preparation, was insignificant compared to Greece's public debt and GDP. Furthermore, the aforementioned arguments do not even take into account the profits (direct and indirect) generated by the Games, which may well have surpassed the above costs. Finally, popular arguments about "rotting" of many of the facilities, appear to ignore the actual utilization of most of these structures.

See also 

 List of 2004 Summer Olympics medal winners
 Olympic records at the 2004 Summer Olympics
 Use of performance-enhancing drugs in the Olympic Games – 2004 Athens
 World records at the 2004 Summer Olympics

Notes

References

External links 

 
 
 Official website
 Pictures from the opening ceremony
 Project to fly the 2004 Olympic Flame around the world on a B747 aircraft
 Pictures backstage from the opening ceremony
 
 BBC coverage

 
Olympic Games in Greece
Sports competitions in Athens
History of Greece since 1974
Olympic Games
Summer Olympics by year
Olympics Games
2000s in Athens
August 2004 sports events in Europe